The Waitakere Tramline is a  long industrial narrow gauge railway near Swanson in the Waitākere Ranges south-west of Auckland in New Zealand, which is being used since 1907 for building and maintaining the dam and water pipeline at the Upper Nihotupu Reservoir. It was used until 2014 also by the Waitakere Tramline Society Inc. for tourist excursions, which have been indefinitely ceased due to a risk assessment.

Location 
From there it runs to the dam at Waitākere Reservoir. The lower section of the rail track from Swanson up beyond the Filter Station was lifted around 1927.

Rolling stock 
One of the locomotives was built in 1976, refurbished in 1985 and  during its second refurbishment in 2000 equipped with a 16 hp Kubota diesel engine and a variable hydraulic drive. Most of the carriages were built in 1978 and upgraded in the 1990s to allow for smoother and more comfortable ride.

Damages and discontinuation of tourist transport 
In November 2011 a leak in the Watercare 600 mm diameter main triggered a substantial slip, taking out a 15 m long section of the adjacent tramline with 6 m of track left dangling in the air. The line has been closed for tourist transport since 24 November 2014, but can still be used by its owner Watercare for maintenance of the dam and pipeline. Sections of the track can be seen from the Waitakere Tramline Loop Track which follows the old tramline through some of its tunnels.

See also 
 Nihotupu Tramline

References 

Rail transport in New Zealand
2 ft gauge railways in New Zealand
Waitākere Ranges
West Auckland, New Zealand